Seoul National University Bundang Hospital (분당 서울대병원) is located in Gumi-dong, Bundang, Seongnam, Gyeonggi-do, South Korea. It began its first treatment on 10 May 2003. It was set up due to a rapid increase in demand for geriatric treatment and the government's request for the establishment of a medical facility for local residents.

Seoul National University Bundang Hospital, consists of 6 departments : the Geriatric Medicine Center, Cardiovascular Center, Clinical Neuroscience Center, Respiratory Center, Joint disease and Reconstruction Center, and the Health Promotion Center, and 23 departments, such as Internal Medicine, Surgery, Chest Surgery, Neurosurgery, Orthopaedics, Plastic Surgery, Obstetrics and Gynaecology, and Pediatrics. There is also an accident and emergency department.

The hospital is situated between Bulgoksan (a hill) and the Tancheon (a stream).

References

External links
Official website

Bundang
Hospital, Bundang
Hospital buildings completed in 2003
Teaching hospitals in South Korea
Hospitals established in 2003
Buildings and structures in Gyeonggi Province
2003 establishments in South Korea